Johnny Curran (22 June 1924 – 24 March 1985) was a Scottish football goalkeeper. He played for Queen's Park, Aberdeen, East Fife, Shrewsbury Town and Watford. From Watford, Curran moved into the Scottish Highland Football to Keith FC, the Banffshire Club

References

External links

1924 births
1985 deaths
Footballers from Glasgow
Scottish footballers
Association football goalkeepers
Queen's Park F.C. players
Aberdeen F.C. players
East Fife F.C. players
Shrewsbury Town F.C. players
Watford F.C. players
Scottish Football League players
English Football League players